Statistics of Belgian First Division in the 1901–02 season.

Overview

This season saw another split, after just one season, into two Groups, this time with a Final Group to decide the champion.
It was contested by 11 teams, and Racing Club de Bruxelles won the championship.

League standings

Championship Cup A

Championship Cup B

Final round

Test match

See also
 1901–02 in Belgian football

References

1901
1901–02 in Belgian football
Belgian First Division, 1913-14